The 2014 NCAA National Collegiate Women's Ice Hockey Tournament involved eight schools in single-elimination play to determine the national champion of women's NCAA Division I college ice hockey. The quarterfinals were contested at the campuses of the seeded teams on March 15, 2014. The Frozen Four was played on March 21 and 23, 2014 at TD Bank Sports Center in Hamden, Connecticut, with Quinnipiac University as the host.

Clarkson University defeated the University of Minnesota 5–4 in the national championship game, in the process becoming the fourth school to have won a National Collegiate championship. This championship was the first by a team not from the WCHA as well as the first by a team from the Eastern United States. It also proved to be the final game for Clarkson's co-head coach Shannon Desrosiers, who had finished her sixth season sharing head coaching duties with her husband Matt. About a month after the championship game, Shannon stepped down, leaving Matt in sole charge. Shannon cited a wish to spend more time raising the couple's young daughter and soon-to-be-born second child.

Qualifying teams 

The winners of the ECAC, WCHA, and Hockey East tournaments all received automatic berths to the NCAA tournament. The other five teams were selected at-large. The top four teams were then seeded and received home ice for the quarterfinals.

Bracket 
Quarterfinals held at home sites of seeded teams

Note: * denotes overtime period(s)

See also 

2014 NCAA Division I Men's Ice Hockey Tournament

References 

NCAA Women's Ice Hockey Tournament
1
2014 in sports in Connecticut